Olivier Rabourdin (born 3 March 1959) is a French film actor. He has appeared in more than seventy films since 1985. In 2010 he was nominated for a French César Award in the category of Best Supporting Actor (Meilleur acteur dans un second rôle) for the role of Christophe in the film Of Gods and Men.

Selected filmography

References

External links
 

1959 births
Living people
French male film actors
French male television actors
21st-century French male actors
Place of birth missing (living people)